James Bishop (27 December 1867 – 15 January 1938) was a Scotland international rugby union player.

Rugby Union career

Amateur career

Bishop played rugby union for Glasgow Academicals.

Provincial career

He played for Glasgow District against Edinburgh District in the inter-city match of 17 December 1892.

Bishop was then capped for Cities District in their match against Anglo-Scots on 24 December 1892. In Edinburgh circles his selection for this combined Glasgow-Edinburgh side caused quite a stir as they favoured their own players. The Scottish Referee newspaper had this advice:
If J.M. Bishop is at all annoyed at the intelligence that his selection for Glasgow-Edinburgh was questioned, it may comfort him to know that in Glasgow where he is known better the unaminous verdict was that he had not a superior in the Inter-City and that higher honours are deserved by him.

He was also capped by West of Scotland District in their match against East of Scotland District on 21 January 1893.

International career

Bishop was capped once by Scotland, in 1893.

References

1867 births
1938 deaths
Cities District players
Glasgow Academicals rugby union players
Glasgow District (rugby union) players
Rugby union players from Partick
Scotland international rugby union players
Scottish rugby union players
West of Scotland District (rugby union) players
Rugby union forwards